The Malaysian Malay-language television mystery music game show I Can See Your Voice Malaysia premiered the third season on TV3 with the first part on 16 February 2020 and then the second part on 21 June 2020. In between two parts, Eid al-Fitr special was also aired on 31 May 2020.

Due to the COVID-19 pandemic, this programme is filmed under health and safety protocols being implemented for this season.

Gameplay

Format
Under the original format, the guest artist can eliminate one or two mystery singers after each round. The game concludes with the last mystery singer standing which depends on the outcome of a duet performance with a guest artist.

Rewards
If the singer is good, he/she will have chance to get a potential contract and a single under Monkey Bone Records and Warner Music Malaysia; if the singer is bad, he/she wins .

Rounds
Each episode presents the guest artist with six people whose identities and singing voices are kept concealed until they are eliminated to perform on the "stage of truth" or remain in the end to perform the final duet.

Episodes

Guest artists

Panelists

Online Concert
For this season, all of winning good singers perform through online concert, in which one of them would grant an exclusive recording contract and a single under Monkey Bone Records and Warner Music Malaysia. A winner is determined through judging criteria, consisting of 60% jury (conducted by Primeworks Studios chief executive officer Izham Omar, Warner Music Malaysia artist and repertoire director Raqeem Brian, panelist Yusry Abdul Halim, composer , and musical artist ); and 40% public votes cast via Xtra website.

Notes

References 

I Can See Your Voice Malaysia
2020 Malaysian television seasons
Television series impacted by the COVID-19 pandemic